Société royale de médecine, Royal Society of Medicine was founded in 1778 and was a predecessor of Paris Society of Medicine.

References

External links
1776 till 1789

History of medicine in France